DXDV (97.5 FM), broadcasting as 97.5 Spirit FM, is a radio station owned and operated by the Roman Catholic Diocese of Mati. The studio is located inside the St. John of the Cross Clergy, Brgy. Madang, Mati, Davao Oriental.

References

Radio stations in Davao Oriental
Catholic radio stations
Christian radio stations in the Philippines